A Breath of Life is the last novel by Brazilian author Clarice Lispector. It was published posthumously in Brazil in the late 1970s. The book takes the form of dialogue between a male "Author" and his female creation, Angela Pralini (a character who shares a name with a character who appears in Lispector's Where Were You at Night). The god-like author infuses the so-called breath of life into his creation who speaks, breathes, lives and dies at his behest. The author loves yet wants to destroy Angela even though he can not ultimately separate her from himself.

The novel has been characterized as a lyrically schizoid duet between two distinct but overlapping voices which delve into the inner nature of thoughts, sensations, words, facts, and objects and the relations between each. The text is also said to confuse the two voices, and open up a wild space of contradiction and paradox.

When Lispector died she left behind a mountain of fragments that compose what became A Breath of Life. The fragments were structured and organized by Olga Borelli, Lispector's assistant and friend. The final form of the book reflects the dark interior dialogue that took place in Lispector's head near the end of her life.

In 2012, A Breath of Life was published for the first time in English by New Directions in a translation by Johnny Lorenz edited by Benjamin Moser.

References 

Novels by Clarice Lispector
Novels published posthumously
1970s novels
Brazilian novels